Edward Stephenson  (c. 1691 – 7 September 1768) was an administrator of the English East India Company. He served as President of Bengal in the mid eighteenth century. He was born in Keswick, Cumberland, in the north west of England. After his service in India he retired to his native town, where his land holdings included two fields between Keswick and Portinscale named the Howrahs, a title thought to commemorate his place of residence in India, Howrah, near Calcutta. His other properties included Governor's House in Lake Road, Keswick. He died there at the age of 77.

Notes

References
 

Presidents of Bengal
English businesspeople
British East India Company civil servants
People from Keswick, Cumbria
Year of birth uncertain
1768 deaths